Return of the Incredible Machine: Contraptions is a video game released in 2000, part of The Incredible Machine video game series.

The Incredible Machine: Even More Contraptions is an expansion pack released in 2001. It started a service allowing players to share their homemade puzzles using a service called "WonSwap". Even More Contraptions also came with a Palm Pilot version of the game that contained its own unique set of parts and puzzles suited for a small screen.

Gameplay
As a full 32-bit Windows 95 game, Contraptions has new 800x600 resolution graphics. Although Contraptions has 250 levels, a few of them are new levels, the majority of them are levels from The Incredible Machine 2.

Reception

GameSpot's Trey Walker said: "The problems in the game are only minor, and they do not detract from the overall experience and the high quality of the puzzles. Return of the Incredible Machine will certainly appeal to amateur inventors and players who are familiar with Rube Goldberg's work, and anyone who appreciates good old-fashioned puzzles will find plenty to enjoy in the game."

IGN's Martin Reyes said: "[...]Return of the Incredible Machine is a vintage blend of educational and entertainment software at their finest."

Reviews
PC World
macHOME
ActionTrip
Game Over Online
Tap-Repeatedly/Four Fat Chicks
Quandary

References

External links

2000 video games
Classic Mac OS games
Dynamix games
Palm OS games
Puzzle video games
Sierra Entertainment games
Single-player video games
Video game sequels
Video games developed in the United States
Video games scored by Christopher Stevens
Video games with expansion packs
Windows games